Sinners International is the fourth album by Norwegian industrial rock outfit Zeromancer. In this album Zeromancer returns to a more industrial, darker sound which was absent in their predecessor Zzyzx, with almost metal sounds at times.

The album has spawned 3 singles; Doppelgänger (I Love You), which spawned a music video, Im Yours To Lose, and It Sounds Like Love (But It Looks Like Sex).

Release information 
On 22 August 2008 the band announced that they had finished recording their fourth full-length album, "Sinners International". The release date, 13 February 2009, was announced on 1 December 2008, although they did not specify if this release date was restricted to Europe, The CD can be purchased from Europe and shipped to North America and most of the world. Along with this announcement, they also gave out their German tour dates starting in Berlin on 27 March 2009.

Track listing 
1. Sinners International – 5:02
2. Doppelgänger I Love You – 4:02
3. My Little Tragedy – 4:05
4. It Sounds Like Love (But It Looks Like Sex) – 3:22
5. Filth Noir – 4:13
6. Fictional – 4:03
7. I'm Yours to Lose – 3:19
8. Two Skulls – 4:10
9. Imaginary Friends – 4:01
10. Ammonite – 6:02

Band Personnel 
Alex Møklebust – vocals
Kim Ljung – bass, backing vocals
Noralf Ronthi – drums
Dan Heide – guitar
Lorry Kristiansen – Keyboard, programming

2009 albums
Zeromancer albums